Shinuchikawa Dam  is a gravity dam located in Ishikawa Prefecture in Japan. The dam is used for power production. The catchment area of the dam is 37.3 km2. The dam impounds about 2  ha of land when full and can store 61 thousand cubic meters of water. The construction of the dam was started on 1981 and completed in 1984.

See also
List of dams in Japan

References

Dams in Ishikawa Prefecture